Martin Stig Andersen (born 1973) is a Danish composer and sound designer, best known for his work on Limbo and Inside, as well as contributions to Wolfenstein II: The New Colossus.

Career
Andersen studied orchestral composition at The Royal Academy of Music in Aarhus, Denmark. After graduating in 2003, he went on to study electro-acoustic composition at City University in London. Andersen cited  spectral composers such as Tristan Murail as inspiration. In 2010, he served as composer and sound designer Limbo, joining mid-development after an earlier sound designer left the project. For the game, Andersen focused on using abstract sounds to define the game's atmosphere. Following the release of Limbo, Andersen created and directed the audio for Inside and composed the soundtrack with SØS Gunver Ryberg, taking inspiration from 1980s horror films, often using synthesizers. The music was created by routing sound through a human skull, creating a "bone-conducting sound." As the game had closer integration between gameplay and audio, Andersen was more involved with the developers, with the boy's breathing being tied to the chest movement. Andersen was able to suggest changes to the game's structure, allowing the music to provide a coherent build-up.

Works

Albums 
 Essential Tree Work (2001–2002)
 Sleepdriver (2004)
 Rabbit at the Airport (2006–2008)

Awards and nominations

References

External links
 

1973 births
Living people
Danish composers
Place of birth missing (living people)